Second Baptist Church may refer to:

United States 
(by state then town or city)
 Second Baptist Church (Los Angeles), listed on the National Register of Historic Places (NRHP)
 Second Baptist Church (Bloomington, Indiana), listed on the NRHP in Monroe County
 Second Baptist Church (Centerville, Iowa), listed on the NRHP in Appanoose County
 Second Baptist Church (Mount Pleasant, Iowa), listed on the NRHP in Henry County
 Second Baptist Church (Detroit, Michigan), listed on the NRHP in Wayne County
 Second Baptist Church (Columbia, Missouri), listed on the NRHP in Boone County
 Second Baptist Church (Neosho, Missouri), listed on the NRHP in Newton County
 Second Baptist Church of Dover, Dover Plains, New York, listed on the NRHP in Dutchess County
 Second Baptist Church (Poughkeepsie, New York), listed on the NRHP in Dutchess County
 Second Baptist Church (Columbus, Ohio)
 Second Baptist Church (Mechanicsburg, Ohio), listed on the NRHP in Champaign County
 Second Baptist Church (Sandusky, Ohio), listed on the NRHP in Erie County
 Second Baptist Church Houston, a megachurch in Harris County, Texas
 Second Baptist Church (Richmond, Virginia)
 Second Baptist Church (Washington, D.C.)

See also
First Baptist Church (disambiguation)
Third Baptist Church (disambiguation)